Korucu can refer to:
Village guard system
 Korucu, Edirne
 Korucu, Elâzığ
 Korucu, İpsala